Wilhelmus Braams (25 August 1886 – 3 July 1955) was a Dutch long-distance runner. He competed in the men's marathon at the 1908 Summer Olympics.

References

External links
 

1886 births
1955 deaths
Athletes (track and field) at the 1908 Summer Olympics
Dutch male long-distance runners
Dutch male marathon runners
Olympic athletes of the Netherlands
Athletes from Rotterdam
20th-century Dutch people